Zürich Schweighof is a railway station in the west of the Swiss city of Zürich, on Schweighofstrasse in the city's Friesenberg quarter. The station is on the Uetliberg line, which is operated by the Sihltal Zürich Uetliberg Bahn (SZU).

The station is served by the following passenger trains:

The station has a single track, and a single platform. The only building is a simple shelter on the platform. Immediately to the west of the station, the line crosses Schweighofstrasse by means of a level crossing.

References

External links 

Schweighof